Cung may be:

Cung Le
Cung language